James Kenneth Galbraith (born January 29, 1952) is an American economist. He is currently a professor at the Lyndon B. Johnson School of Public Affairs and at the Department of Government, University of Texas at Austin. He is also a Senior Scholar with the Levy Economics Institute of Bard College and part of the executive committee of the World Economics Association, created in 2011.

Background 
Galbraith is a son of the renowned Canadian-American economist John Kenneth Galbraith and  Catherine (Kitty) Atwater Galbraith and is the brother of the former diplomat, commentator and 2016 Vermont gubernatorial candidate Peter W. Galbraith. He earned his BA, magna cum laude, from Harvard in 1974 and PhD from Yale in 1981, both in economics.  From 1974 to 1975, Galbraith studied as a Marshall Scholar at King's College, Cambridge.

Career
From 1981 to 1982, Galbraith served on the staff of the Congress of the United States, eventually as Executive Director of the Joint Economic Committee.  In 1985, he was a guest scholar at the Brookings Institution.

Galbraith is currently a professor at the Lyndon B. Johnson School of Public Affairs and at the Department of Government, University of Texas at Austin. Galbraith heads up the University of Texas Inequality Project (UTIP), which has been described by economic historian Lord Skidelsky as "pioneering inequality measurement". UTIP is also noted for replacing the established Gini coefficient with the Theil index as the measurement of choice for comparing inequality between groups, regions and countries.

In March 2008 Galbraith used the 25th Annual Milton Friedman Distinguished Lecture to launch a sweeping attack on the Washington Consensus on free market policies, especially the monetarist version. He argued strongly that Keynesian economics offered a solution to the financial crisis that started in 2007 whereas monetarist policies would deepen the recession. Towards the end of 2008 and into 2009 many policymakers around the world increased government spending and/or cut taxes, arguably in line with Galbraith’s views, as part of the  Keynesian resurgence described  by the Financial Times as "a stunning reversal of the orthodoxy of the past several decades".

In 2010 he edited an edition of his father's works for the  Library of America series.

Writings 

Galbraith argues that modern America has fallen prey to a wealthy, government-controlling "predatory class":

Galbraith is also highly critical of the Bush administration's foreign policy apropos of the Iraq invasion:

Much like his father in writing A Tenured Professor, the junior Galbraith is also a critic of his own profession:

Humanitarian initiatives 
Galbraith is the Chairman of Economists for Peace and Security, formerly known as Economists Against the Arms Race and later Economists Allied for Arms Reduction (ECAAR), an international association of professional economists concerned with peace and security issues.

In 2009, he joined the project for Soldiers of Peace, a documentary for global peace and against all wars,  which has won various awards in film festivals.

Books
 .
 .
 .
 .
 .
 
 
 .
 .
 .

References

External links 

 , with an archive of his papers.
 .
 , 93 minutes.
 .
 

1952 births
Living people
21st-century American economists
Post-Keynesian economists
American essayists
American political writers
Harvard University alumni
Yale Graduate School of Arts and Sciences alumni
Alumni of King's College, Cambridge
University of Texas at Austin faculty
Marshall Scholars
American economics writers
American columnists
American male essayists